Marie-Ginette Guay is a Canadian film and television actress from Quebec. She is most noted for her performance as Lucette Simoneau in the film Continental, a Film Without Guns (Continental, un film sans fusil), for which she was a Genie Award nominee for Best Supporting Actress at the 28th Genie Awards in 2008.

Filmography

Film

Television

References

External links

Living people
20th-century Canadian actresses
21st-century Canadian actresses
Canadian television actresses
Canadian film actresses
Canadian stage actresses
French Quebecers
Actresses from Quebec
Year of birth missing (living people)